Mika Kononen (born March 26, 1971) is a Finnish former professional ice hockey forward.

Kononen played one game in the SM-liiga for KalPa during the 1990–91 SM-liiga season. He spent the majority of his career with his hometown team IPK, from 1987 to 1990 and from 1992 to 1999.

References

External links

1971 births
Living people
Finnish ice hockey forwards
Iisalmen Peli-Karhut players
KalPa players
People from Iisalmi
Sportspeople from North Savo